The 1982 Cuore Cup was a men's tennis tournament played on indoor carpet courts at the Palazzo dello Sport in Milan, Italy. The event was part of the Super Series tier of the 1982 Volvo Grand Prix circuit. It was the fifth edition of the tournament and was held from 22 March through 28 March 1982. Second-seeded Guillermo Vilas won the singles title an earned $70,000 first prize money.  He entered the tournament on a wildcard after John McEnroe, the winner of the three previous editions, withdrew due to an ankle injury.

Finals

Singles
 Guillermo Vilas defeated  Jimmy Connors 6–3, 6–3
 It was Vilas' 3rd singles title of the year and the 55th of his career.

Doubles
 Peter McNamara /  Heinz Günthardt defeated  Mark Edmondson /  Sherwood Stewart 7–6, 7–6

References

External links
 ITF tournament edition details

Milan
Cuore Cup
Cuore Cup
Milan Indoor